First West Yorkshire operates both local and regional bus services in West Yorkshire, England. It is a subsidiary of the FirstGroup, and is made up of three sub-division brands: First Bradford, First Halifax, Calder Valley & Huddersfield and First Leeds.

History

In April 1974, West Yorkshire Passenger Transport Executive was formed, with the municipal fleets of Bradford, Calderdale, Halifax, Huddersfield and Leeds combined. Services were branded under the MetroBus brand, with a cream and verona green livery adopted.

To comply with the Transport Act 1985, West Yorkshire Passenger Transport Executive bus operations were transferred to a separate legal entity – rebranded as Yorkshire Rider. The livery changed to a bright green and cream livery with a stylised "YR" logo, plus the name "Yorkshire Rider", with an area on the logo that incorporated the town in which the garage for that bus was located. In October 1988, Yorkshire Rider was sold in a management buyout.

In August 1989, Yorkshire Rider purchased the West Yorkshire Road Car Company, a former National Bus Company subsidiary who operated services in Bradford, Leeds and Otley, from AJS Holdings. The 'West Yorkshire' trading name was retained by Yorkshire Rider for nearly a year following the takeover, after which it was removed in a restructuring of former WYRCC operations.

In April 1994, Yorkshire Rider was sold to Badgerline for £38 million. Badgerline and its subsidiaries were later merged with the GRT Group in April 1995 to form the FirstGroup.

In September 1995, Yorkshire Rider was split into four separate divisions: Bradford Traveller, Calderline, Kingfisher Huddersfield and Leeds City Link. However in February 1998, all these were respectively renamed First Bradford, First Calderdale, First Huddersfield and First Leeds as part of the rollout of the FirstGroup brand.

During the early 2000s, several were merged. First Quickstep were based at the same Kirkstall Road depot as First Leeds but as a separate entity running several services around the Leeds area until it was merged into First Leeds' operation, while First Calderdale and First Huddersfield merged in 2003 to form First Calderdale & Huddersfield.

In July 2005, First Leeds purchased Morley-based Black Prince Buses. The family-run independent's last buses left service on 31 July, with First taking on most of Black Prince's services from 1 August.

On 18 May 2008, the company's Kirkstall Road depot, first opened in 1897, was closed after 111 years of service. Staff and operations were subsequently moved to a new depot at Hunslet. Named Hunslet Park, the new depot was opened with a capacity of 200 buses with room for additional expansion.

In 2009, the management of the three FirstGroup sub-divisions in West Yorkshire, as well as First York were centralised, creating First West Yorkshire.

First's Todmorden outstation was partially demolished in 2015, converting the site into an open-air yard housing 24 vehicles.

The operations of First West Yorkshire and First York are to be remerged into a First North and West Yorkshire business unit on 1 October 2022, with current Managing Director Paul Matthews temporarily overseeing operations of the new business unit until a new Managing Director can be recruited. This is part of major changes to the FirstGroup's senior management, which will see the merger of First's ten regional bus operations across the United Kingdom into six business units.

Operations
As of June 2022, excluding First York, the company operates from five depots in the region: Bradford, Bramley, Halifax, Huddersfield and Hunslet. The company also maintains an open-air outstation in Todmorden.

Leeds

First Leeds operate buses in the city of Leeds and surrounding areas from the Bramley and Hunslet Park depots, the latter replacing the former Kirkstall Road site in 2008. 

First's Leeds services were rebranded to LeedsCity in early 2018, with First's standard fleet livery replaced with a predominantly green livery, of which was first applied to over 120 new Wright StreetDecks delivered between 2018 and 2022. Since 2019, it is also rolled out to pre-existing fleet vehicles. In 2020, nine Yutong E10s, the first zero-emissions buses in West Yorkshire, entered service. This is to be followed by 32 Electroliner battery electric buses produced by Wrightbus.

In partnership with Leeds City Council and West Yorkshire Combined Authority, First Leeds also operates a network of park and ride bus services in the city. As of June 2022, there are three sites at Elland Road, Temple Green and Stourton, numbered P&R1-3 respectively. The network first went into operation in June 2014 with the early opening of the Elland Road site for the Grand Départ of the 2014 Tour de France, followed by a full opening later that month. A second site at Temple Green was opened in 2017, and a third site powered by self-sustainable solar panels was opened in Stourton in 2021. The network is operated by a fleet of hybrid electric Wright StreetDeck HEV and battery electric Alexander Dennis Enviro400EV double-deck vehicles branded in dedicated liveries.

Bradford

First Bradford operate buses in Bradford and surrounding areas.

Bradford's flagship services are the Leeds to Bradford 72 and express X6 services, which run via Bowling Back Lane depot. However, the 72 route was ran by Bramley depot until 2019. In 2012, refurbished former ftr Wright StreetCar articulated buses operated route 72. These were withdrawn in July 2016 and replaced by a fleet of double-deck Wright StreetDeck vehicles delivered in both the standard Olympia livery for route 72 and a route-branded dark blue and gold livery for the X6. Route 72 was initially operated by First Leeds but is now operated by First Bradford. These StreetDecks have since been replaced by a newer batch in a 2-tone blue livery as shown in the adjacent photo, cascading the older StreetDecks to city routes.

In March 2022, ahead of the start of Bradford's Clean Air Zone later that year, First Bradford launched the City of Bradford branding, which was first applied to 28 new Wright StreetDecks delivered for service on the X6, 72 and X11, replacing older StreetDecks. Other buses at Bowling Back Lane were repainted into the City of Bradford livery, This was followed by 11 new City of Bradford-branded Wright StreetLites entering service in the summer, whilst a rollout of the new two-tone blue livery is currently underway for pre-existing fleet vehicles based at Bradford depot. The ZEBRA bid plans to bring new electric buses to West Yorkshire, including First Bradford in early 2023.

Halifax, Calder Valley & Huddersfield
First Halifax, Calder Valley & Huddersfield is an amalgamation of the First Halifax and First Huddersfield operations, running services in their respective towns as well as the Calder Valley region.

Until recently, some buses in Halifax and Huddersfield were branded for the Holme Valley Connection, Calder Connect, Red Arrow and Zest networks respectively, with refurbished buses receiving free WiFi and an improvement in bus frequency. In 2018, the HD Connect network was launched in Huddersfield, with buses for services 370, 371 and 372 receiving new blue branding, live service tracking and ticket machines with contactless payment. The HD Connect network has expanded on these services since. First Halifax initially opted for the HX Connect livery, with a darker blue front, but it was soon scrapped and replaced by a modified version of the Olympia livery.

Fleet
As of July 2017, the fleet consisted of 882 buses.

FTR and Hyperlink

In 2006, following the introduction of the service in York, which had been beset by problems, Leeds was chosen to be the second First operation to launch an FTR (stylised ftr) service. 17 articulated Wright StreetCars were initially acquired for the service, which was officially launched in August 2007 following the alteration of bus lanes, road layouts and the construction of raised kerbs at bus stops. The FTR StreetCars operated on the 4 service serving Pudsey, central Leeds and Seacroft until 2012, when they were redeployed and refurbished alongside ex-York StreetCars to operate on the Leeds-Bradford Hyperlink route 72; these were finally withdrawn in 2016 and replaced with new StreetDecks.

References

External links

First West Yorkshire Limited on Companies House
First Bradford, First Halifax, Calder Valley & Huddersfield and First Leeds website

FirstGroup bus operators in England
Bus operators in West Yorkshire